The spiny chromis (Acanthochromis polyacanthus) is a species of damselfish from the western Pacific. It is the only member of the genus Acanthochromis.

Taxonomy 
The spiny chromis was first formally described in 1855 as Dascyllus polyacanthus by the Dutch ichthyologist Pieter Bleeker with the type locality given as Batman in the Moluccas. It is the only species in the genus Acanthochromis. The genus name is a compound of acanthus meaning "spine", probably a reference to the 17 dorsal-fin spines, and Chromis, presumably referring to a relationship to that genus. The specific name polyacanthus means "many-spined".

Distribution and habitat
The spiny chromis is found in the western Pacific Ocean. It is found in western and central Indonesia, Papua New Guinea, northern Australia, and all the islands in the Philippines except Luzon. They are also found in Melanesia. This fish usually lives in coral reefs.

Description
Its fins have 17 dorsal spines, 14 to 16 dorsal rays, 2 anal spines, and 14 to 16 anal rays. This fish is gray on the front and white on the back. The top of its dorsal fin and the bottom of its anal fin is black. Some individuals are gray with a yellow horizontal line in the middle.

Ecology

Diet
This fish is planktonivorous. Younger individuals have been known to eat mucus off the adults.

Life Cycle
The spiny chromis, unlike many other coral reef fishes, has direct development of their larvae, which means that the parents protect their brood from the egg stage (which are laid on the reef), through hatching and onto the fully developed juvenile stage. There is no pelagic larval stage unlike the vast majority of coral reef fishes. This form of direct development means that the offspring often take up residence on the reef not far from where they were hatched. Consequently, high levels of local adaptation to their local environment has been recorded in this species.

References

External links

 

Chrominae
Fish described in 1855
Taxa named by Pieter Bleeker